Nuța Olaru (born August 28, 1970 in Orodel, Dolj) is a female long-distance runner originally from Romania, who became a naturalized United States citizen in November 2012. She specializes in the marathon race. She set her personal best (2:24:33) in the women's marathon in Chicago, IL on October 10, 2004.

She won the Big Sur Marathon in 2012, 2013 and 2014, ran the 2013 Boston Marathon in 2:42:57 and the 2014 Boston Marathon in 2:37:29.

In April 2013, Olaru teamed up with the product development, ROLL Recovery, in Boulder, Colorado to help develop tools for runners.

Achievements

References

sports-reference

1970 births
Living people
Romanian emigrants to the United States
Romanian female long-distance runners
Romanian female marathon runners
Athletes (track and field) at the 2004 Summer Olympics
Olympic athletes of Romania
People from Dolj County